Kudzai Sauramba (born January 24, 1992 in Mutare) is a Zimbabwean first-class cricketer. He is currently part of Mountaineers cricket team as wicket-keeper and was a part of Zimbabwe national under-19 cricket team when South Africa national under-19 cricket team visited Zimbabwe in July 2010. In December 2020, he was selected to play for the Mountaineers in the 2020–21 Logan Cup.

References

External links
 

1992 births
Living people
Zimbabwean cricketers
Mountaineers cricketers
Cricketers from Mutare
Wicket-keepers